Chae Man-sik or Ch'ae Mansik (June 17, 1902 – June 11, 1950) was a Korean novelist known for his satirical bent.

Life
Chae Man-sik was born in Okgu (now Gunsan), Jeollabuk-do, South Korea, to a family of the Pyeonggang Chae clan. He graduated from Choongang High School and attended Waseda University in Tokyo, Japan. He worked as a reporter for the publications Dong-a Ilbo, Chosun Ilbo, and Gaebyeok, as well as working as an editor for the Gaebyeok Publishing Company's many magazines, including Hyeseong (Comet) and Jeilseon (Frontline). Chae Man-sik entered the literary scene with the publication of his short story "Toward the Three Paths" (1924). He first gained critical attention ten years later with the publication of the short story "A Ready-Made Life" (1934). In 1936 he moved to Kaesong (now in North Korea) to devote himself solely to creative writing.

Career
After publishing his first short story, "Toward the Three Paths" (1924) in the magazine Joseon Literary World (:ko:조선문단), Chae Man-sik's literary career began. His early stories and plays were written from a class-sensitive perspective, and, with the publication of "A Ready-Made Life" (1934), he began to focus his attention specifically on the plight of intellectuals and artists during an era of colonial oppression, which he expanded upon in later works such as "An Intellectual and Mung-Bean Cake" and "My Innocent Uncle" (1938).

Having been arrested by the Japanese colonial government in 1938 as a result of his affiliation with the Society for Reading, Chae Man-sik was released on the condition that he participate in a pro-Japanese literary organization, the Korean Literary Society for Patriotism (조선문인보국회). Chae complied, writing a handful of pro-Japanese works as a result, including a celebratory account of what he had observed when visiting the Japanese Army's Manchurian Front in December 1942. After Korea's liberation from Japanese colonial rule, however, Chae Man-sik openly reproached the pro-Japanese actions of Korean intellectuals at the end of the colonial period, his own included, by writing such works as Sinner Against the Nation and "The Path of History" (1946).

Until his death in 1950 (shortly before the outbreak of the Korean War), Chae Man-sik continued to produce satires of contemporary society in post-liberation Korea. The short stories "Constable Maeng" (1946) and "Story of a Rice Paddy" are particularly noteworthy in this regard, focusing on the turbulence and confusion of a society embarking upon the difficult process of rebuilding a nation. He published over 290 works in total throughout his life, including novels, short stories, essays, plays, and reviews.

Chae Man-sik's collected works were published in 1989 in the quarterly magazine Creation and Criticism by the publishing house Changbi (formerly known as Creation and Criticism until 2003).

Works

Works in Korean (partial)
 "Disappearing Shadows" (1931)
 Leaving the Doll's House (1933)
 "Ready-Made Life" (1934)
 The Muddy Current (1937)
 Peace Under Heaven (1938)
 "My Idiot Uncle" (1938)
 "Cuckoo" (1938)
 The Passion of Gold (1939)
 "The Loser's Tomb" (1939)
 Frozen Fish (1940)
 "The Path of History" (1946)
 "Constable Maeng" (1946)
 "Mister Bang" (1946)
 Sinner Against the Nation (1948)
 "Wife and Children" (1948)

Works in Translation
 Peace Under Heaven: A Modern Korean Novel (Routledge, 1993), translated by Chun Kyung-Ja 
 "The Wife and Children" in Land of Exile: Contemporary Korean Fiction (Routledge, 1993, 2007 - expanded edition), ed. Marshall R. Pihl, Bruce Fulton, Ju-Chan Fulton 
 "My Idiot Uncle" in The Rainy Spell and Other Korean Stories (Routledge, 1997), edited and translated by Seo Jimun (Suh Ji-moon) 
 "A Ready-Made Life" in A Ready-Made Life: Early Masters of Modern Korean Fiction (University of Hawaiʻi Press, 1998), ed. Bruce Fulton and Kim Chong-un 
 "My Innocent Uncle" in My Innocent Uncle (Jimoondang(지문당), 2003), translated by Bruce Fulton, Ju-Chan Fulton, Kim Chong-un, and Robert Armstrong 
 "My Innocent Uncle" in Modern Korean Fiction: An Anthology (Columbia University Press, 2005), ed. Bruce Fulton and Kwon Youngmin 
 "Constable Maeng" in Waxen Wings: The ACTA Koreana Anthology of Short Fiction from Korea (Koryo Press, 2011), ed. Bruce Fulton, translated by Joel Stevenson 
 Transgressor of the Nation (Literature Translation Institute of Korea, 2013), translated by Jane Kim 
 Frozen Fish (Literature Translation Institute of Korea, 2013), translated by Myles Ji 
 The Cuckoo (Literature Translation Institute of Korea, 2013), translated by Jamie Chang 
 "Mister Pang" in Rat Fire: Korean Stories from the Japanese Empire (Cornell University Press, 2013), ed. Theodore Hughes 
 Three Paths (Literature Translation Institute of Korea, 2014), translated by Jamie Chang 
 Juvesenility (ASIA Publishers, 2015), translated by Bruce Fulton and Ju-Chan Fulton 
 Turbid River (Dalkey Archive Press, 2016), translated by Chung-Hee Kim 
 Sunset: A Ch'ae Manshik Reader (Columbia University Press, 2017), translated by Bruce Fulton and Ju-Chan Fulton

References 

1950 deaths
Literature of Korea under Japanese rule
Korean novelists
1902 births
20th-century novelists
People from Gunsan